Aziza Jafarzade (December 29, 1921 in Baku, Azerbaijan – September 4, 2003) was an Azerbaijani writer and professor of philology. She was an expert on the history of Azerbaijani literature.

References

Azerbaijani writers
Azerbaijani novelists
Azerbaijani women novelists
Azerbaijani women short story writers
Azerbaijani philologists
Azerbaijani professors
Azerbaijani women academics
1921 births
2003 deaths
20th-century Azerbaijani novelists
21st-century Azerbaijani novelists
20th-century Azerbaijani women writers
20th-century Azerbaijani writers
21st-century Azerbaijani women writers
Writers from Baku
21st-century Azerbaijani writers
Soviet writers